Andrzej Wróbel is a paralympic athlete from Poland competing mainly in category T37 distance events.

Andrzej has competed at and medaled in three Paralympics.  His first games were in Barcelona in 1992 where he competed in the 100m, 400m and long jump as well as his more usual 5000m on top of winning a bronze in the 1500m and gold in the 800m.  In both the 1996 and 2000 Summer Paralympics he competed in the 800m, 1500m and 5000m improving to gold in the 1500m and winning a silver in the 800m in 1996 and defending his 1500m in Sydney in 2000.

References

External links
 

Paralympic athletes of Poland
Athletes (track and field) at the 1992 Summer Paralympics
Athletes (track and field) at the 1996 Summer Paralympics
Athletes (track and field) at the 2000 Summer Paralympics
Paralympic gold medalists for Poland
Paralympic silver medalists for Poland
Paralympic bronze medalists for Poland
Polish male middle-distance runners
Living people
Place of birth missing (living people)
Year of birth missing (living people)
Medalists at the 1992 Summer Paralympics
Medalists at the 1996 Summer Paralympics
Medalists at the 2000 Summer Paralympics
Paralympic medalists in athletics (track and field)
21st-century Polish people
20th-century Polish people